The following persons have served as Tongan High Commissioner to Australia. Countries belonging to the Commonwealth of Nations typically exchange High Commissioners, rather than Ambassadors. Though there are a few technical and historical differences, they are now in practice one and the same office. Crown Prince ʻAhoʻeitu ʻUnuakiʻotonga Tukuʻaho was appointed the first High Commissioner of the Kingdom of Tonga to Australia in 2008, but left office in 2012 upon the death of his brother King George Tupou V to succeed him as King Tupou VI. The current High Commissioner is Princess ʻAngelika Lātūfuipeka Tukuʻaho, the eldest daughter of the current King of Tonga, who presented her credentials on August 22, 2012.

See also
 Australia–Tonga relations

References

Australia and the Commonwealth of Nations
 
Tonga and the Commonwealth of Nations
2008 establishments in Tonga
2008 establishments in Australia
Australia
Tonga